Ilya Yevgenyevich Svinov (born 25 September 2000) is a Russian football player who plays for FC Fakel Voronezh on loan from FC Spartak Moscow.

Club career
He made his debut in the Russian Football National League for FC Fakel Voronezh on 10 July 2021 in a game against FC Baltika Kaliningrad.

On 4 December 2021, he signed a contract with FC Spartak Moscow until 31 May 2025, with the club option to extend for an additional year.

On 6 June 2022, he returned to FC Fakel Voronezh on a one-year loan deal. Svinov made his Russian Premier League debut for Fakel on 6 August 2022 against PFC CSKA Moscow.

Career statistics

References

External links
 
 Profile by Russian Football National League

2000 births
Sportspeople from Tolyatti
Living people
Russian footballers
Association football goalkeepers
FC Lada-Tolyatti players
FC Nosta Novotroitsk players
FC Fakel Voronezh players
FC Spartak Moscow players
FC Spartak-2 Moscow players
Russian Second League players
Russian First League players
Russian Premier League players